Gigolo and Whore II (Chinese: 舞男情未了) is a 1992 Hong Kong film directed by Andy Chin and starring Simon Yam, Rosamund Kwan, Veronica Yip, Alex Fong, Kong Man-Sing and . It is a sequel to the 1991 film Gigolo and Whore.

Plot
Sherin (Rosamund Kwan), a rich and beautiful lesbian has acquired the family business of Johnson (Alex Fong), Johnson then go to a gigolo bar and hire a gigolo in order to get his company back. The owner of the gigolo bar Jenny (Veronica Yip) recommends gigolo trainee Bill (Jackie Lui) to go for the mission, but Bill doesn't make it and fell in love with Sherin's girl friend (Jacqueline Ng). Bill's trainer Jack (Simon Yam), Hong Kong number one gigolo then accepts a HK$10 million offer from Johnson and starts to convert Sherin from her current sexual identity into a man-loving heterosexual. Nearly succeeds, Jack finds himself in love with Sherin...

Cast and roles
 Simon Yam	– Jack Cheung
 Rosamund Kwan – Sherin Chan
 Veronica Yip – Jenny
 Alex Fong	– Johnson Lee
  – Bill
  – Ching
 Kong Man-Sing – Sherin's Dad
  – Bull Dyke

Box office
The film grossed HK$8,149,000 at the Hong Kong box office during its theatrical run from 12 to 25 March 1992 in Hong Kong.

References

External links
 
 
 Gigolo and Whore II at Hong Kong Cinemagic
 Gigolo and Whore II in Hong Kong Film Archive

Hong Kong comedy films
Films set in Hong Kong
1992 films
1990s Cantonese-language films